Eun-mi, also spelled Eun-mee, or Un-mee, is a Korean feminine given name. Its meaning differs based on the hanja used to write each syllable of the name. There are 26 hanja with the reading "eun" and 33 hanja with the reading "mi" on the South Korean government's official list of hanja which may be registered for use in given names.

People with this name include:
Lee Eun-mi (singer) (born 1966), South Korean singer
Kim Eun-mi (gymnast) (born 1972), South Korean gymnast
Bae Eun-mi (born 1973), South Korean gymnast
Kim Eun-mi (born 1975), South Korean handball player
Ko Eun-mi (born 1976), South Korean actress
Seok Eun-mi (born 1976), South Korean table tennis player
Choi Eun-mi (born 1978), South Korean novelist
Park Eun-mi (born 1987), South Korean track cyclist
Lee Eun-mi (footballer) (born 1988), South Korean football player
Yoo Eun-mi (born 2004), South Korean actress

See also
List of Korean given names

References

Korean feminine given names